Chloé Graftiaux (18 July 1987 in Brussels, Belgium – 21 August 2010 in Courmayeur, Italy) was a Belgian sport climber and alpinist who fell to her death on the  Aiguille Noire de Peuterey in the Mont Blanc massif, aged 23.

In the 2010 season of the IFSC Bouldering World Cup, she won Gold at the World Cup events in Vail, and Sheffield, and finished third in the overall 2010 standings. Graftiux was a strong alpinist, climbing to mixed grade M11 and ice climbing to grade grade WI6, and the French Alpine Club selected her for the 2008-2009 Groupe Excellence Alpinisme. In January 2010, she won the Ice Master-Worldcup ice climbing competition in Valle di Daone in Italy.

On 21 August 2010, she climbed the Aiguille Noire de Peuterey with her climbing partner, Nicolas. While descending the south face of the mountain a boulder came loose. She was not roped up and she fell to her death.  In 2011, a non-profit foundation, "Chloé Graftiaux Passion Together", was created to give scholarships to young climbers. In June 2020, Belgian rock climber Anak Verhoeven established Belgium's hardest sport climb and first-ever 8c+/9a route and named it Kraftio in her memory.

See also
 Muriel Sarkany, Belgian rock climber
 Claudine van der Straten-Ponthoz, Belgian-French mountaineer

References

External links

 Official website
 IFSC Profile
 VIDEO:Tribute to Chloe Graftiaux Rock & Ice (2011)

1987 births
2010 deaths
Belgian rock climbers
Belgian mountain climbers
Mountaineering deaths
Sport deaths in Italy
Sportspeople from Brussels
Female climbers
IFSC Climbing World Cup overall medalists
Boulder climbers